The Sexenio Democrático or Sexenio Revolucionario (English: The six democratic or revolutionary years) is a period of 6 years between 1868 and 1874 in the history of Spain.

The Sexenio Democrático starts on 30 September 1868 with the overthrow of Queen Isabella II of Spain after the Glorious Revolution, and ends on 29 December 1874 with the Bourbon Restoration, when Isabella's son Alfonso XII became King after a coup d'état by Arsenio Martínez-Campos.

The sexenio spawned the most progressive 19th-century Spanish constitution, the 1869 Constitution, the one dedicating the most space to the rights of the Spanish citizens.

Three phases can be distinguished in Sexenio Democrático:
 The Provisional Government (1868–1871) (September 1868 – January 1871)
 The rule of King Amadeo I of Spain (January 1871 – February 1873)
 The First Spanish Republic (February 1873 – December 1874)

The Sexenio Democrático was a politically very unstable period.

Sources 

1860s in Spain
1870s in Spain